State Route 206 (SR 206) is 7.6 mile long north-south state highway in Tipton County, Tennessee. Even though it is signed north-south, SR 206 goes almost completely east-west.

Route description

SR 206 begins at an intersection with SR 14, where it heads northwest, then west, along Atoka Idaville Road through farmland and rural areas. It then enters Atoka, where it passes through neighborhoods before turning north along Main Street to pass through downtown. The highway turns west again along Atoka Munford Road as it passes through a business district before coming to an intersection with US 51/SR 3. SR 206 then immediately crosses into Munford as Munford Avenue to by some businesses and several neighborhoods before entering downtown, where it comes to an end at an intersection with SR 178. The entire route of SR 206 is a two-lane highway.

Major intersections

References

206
Transportation in Tipton County, Tennessee